Ota Bubeníček (31 October 1871 in Uhříněves – 10 September 1962 in Mladá Vožice) was a Czech landscape painter. He was also widely regarded as Bohemia's greatest marionnetter.

References
Ota Bubeníček (1871-1962) - Galerie Marold (www.marold.cz)
Burget, Eduard, Ondřej Váša, and Ota Bubeníček. Ota Bubeníček. Prague: Nadace Karla Svolinského a Vlasty Kubátové, 2007.
Malik, Jan. Puppetry in Czechoslovakia. Prague: Orbis, 1948.

1871 births
1962 deaths
20th-century Czech painters
Czech male painters
Landscape painters
Czech puppeteers
Artists from Prague
20th-century Czech male artists